Breb may refer to one of two entities in Maramureș County, Romania:

 Breb, a village in Ocna Şugatag Commune
 Breb River, another name for the Breboaia River

See also 
 Brebu (disambiguation)
 Brebina (disambiguation)
 Brebeni, the name of three villages in Romania